Costa Rica is competing at the 2013 World Aquatics Championships in Barcelona, Spain between July 20 and August 4, 2013.

Open water swimming

Costa Rica has qualified the following swimmers in open water marathon.

Swimming

Costa Rican swimmers earned qualifying standards in the following events (up to a maximum of 2 swimmers in each event at the A-standard entry time, and 1 at the B-standard):

Men

Women

Synchronised swimming

Costa Rica has qualified twelve synchronized swimmers.

References

External links
Barcelona 2013 Official Site

Nations at the 2013 World Aquatics Championships
2013
World Aquatics Championships